Henry Bennion Eyring (born May 31, 1933) is an American educational administrator, author, and religious leader. Eyring has been the Second Counselor to Russell M. Nelson in the First Presidency of the Church of Jesus Christ of Latter-day Saints (LDS Church) since January 14, 2018. Previously, Eyring was the First Counselor to Thomas S. Monson in the First Presidency from 2008 until Monson's death on January 2, 2018. Eyring was the Second Counselor to Gordon B. Hinckley in the First Presidency from October 6, 2007, until Hinckley's death on January 27, 2008.

While he has been a general authority of the church, Eyring has also served in the Quorum of the Twelve Apostles, the First Quorum of the Seventy, and the Presiding Bishopric.  As a result, he is the only person so far to have served in all four groups of top leadership in the church.  Eyring has served twice as Commissioner of the Church Educational System. Currently, he is the fifth most senior apostle among the ranks of the church.

Early life
Eyring was born in Princeton, New Jersey, the second child of Henry Eyring, then a professor at Princeton and later the dean of the graduate school at the University of Utah and president of the American Chemical Society, and his wife, Mildred Bennion. His father's sister, Camilla Eyring, married Spencer W. Kimball, making Henry B. the nephew of Kimball, who was the 12th president of the LDS Church.

He lived in Princeton until his early teenage years. Until the start of World War II they attended LDS meetings at the branch in New Brunswick, New Jersey, but with the gasoline rationing of the war, they received permission to hold meetings in their home, which often had only the Eyring family. As a teenager, Eyring and his family moved to Salt Lake City, where his father took a post at the University of Utah.

Military service and education
Eyring spent two years in the U.S. Air Force, stationed at Sandia Base in New Mexico. In New Mexico, Eyring served as a district missionary for the LDS Church. Eyring had been in the ROTC at the University of Utah. While in the Air Force, he served as a liaison between military officers and scientists. His main responsibility was to analyze data from weapons tests of nuclear weapons. At the end of the assignment, he gave a report and ended up meeting in person with a collection of several leading generals.

He had previously received a bachelor's degree in physics from the University of Utah. He went on to earn both master's and doctoral degrees in Business Administration from the Harvard Business School, before embarking on a career in academia. Over the summer after his first year at Harvard, Eyring did an internship with Arthur D. Little as a consultant for Abitibi Power and Paper Company. He did an analysis to study how to improve the process of river logging. His suggestion was to abandon river logging and turn to truck transport of logs, but a combination of not calculating the issue deeply enough and having a CEO of the company who had risen through the ranks from being a river logger prevented Eyring's suggestions from being adopted then.

While studying at Harvard, Eyring was heavily influenced by Georges Doriot, who offered Eyring a chance to work with him and Ken Olsen, the founder of Digital Equipment Company. Eyring chose instead to pursue a doctorate in business.

Academic and business career
In the fall of 1962, Eyring began work as a professor at Stanford University. He completed his doctorate in business in the summer of 1963. That summer, Eyring did a fellowship with the RAND Corporation. Eyring had married his wife, Kathleen, the summer before he started at Stanford, and they spent their first year of married life moving through various homes his real estate developer father-in-law was in the process of refurbishing. They then spent the next 10 years living in the guest house of his in-laws' property.

Among Eyring's associates at Stanford were Roger Sant and Ed Zschau. Eyring worked with Zschau in the founding of the computer company System Industries.

Eyring was an associate professor of business at the Stanford Graduate School of Business from 1962 to 1971. He was also a Sloan Visiting Faculty Fellow at the Massachusetts Institute of Technology. At MIT, he took multiple courses in human behavior, including courses from Douglas McGregor, who died of a heart attack while Eyring was at MIT, and also Ed Schein and Warren Bennis.

Eyring has served twice as Commissioner of Church Education, from September 1980 to April 1985, and from September 1992 to January 2005, when he was replaced by W. Rolfe Kerr.

LDS Church service

Among other callings in the LDS Church, Eyring has served as a regional representative, bishop and member of the Sunday School General Board. Eyring served as an early-morning seminary teacher early in his time as a professor at Stanford University, and as bishop of the Stanford singles ward later on.

Eyring served as president of Ricks College from 1971 to 1977, as a counselor to Presiding Bishop Robert D. Hales from 1985 to 1992, and as a member of the First Quorum of the Seventy, from 1992 to 1995.

Following the death of church president Howard W. Hunter, Eyring was sustained as a member of the church's Quorum of the Twelve Apostles on April 1, 1995 and ordained an apostle later that week.

Eyring was sustained as Second Counselor in the church's First Presidency on October 6, 2007, filling the vacancy left by the death of James E. Faust, on August 10, 2007. When the First Presidency was reorganized following the death of Gordon B. Hinckley, Eyring was called and set apart as the First Counselor on February 3, 2008. The new First Presidency, with Monson as president, was announced on February 4, 2008.

As a member of the First Presidency, Eyring has dedicated the San Salvador El Salvador, Gilbert Arizona, Payson Utah, Indianapolis Indiana, and Philadelphia Pennsylvania Temples where he had also presided at the groundbreaking in 2011 as well as rededicating the Buenos Aires Argentina and Mexico City Mexico Temples.

In 2014, after a meeting with Pope Francis, Eyring spoke at Humanum, "an International Interreligious Colloquium on The Complementarity of Man and Woman," held in Vatican City. It was the first time that a pope and a top LDS general authority ever met.

Family
Eyring and his wife, Kathleen Johnson, met at a YSA meeting held at Rindge, New Hampshire at the Cathedral of the Pines in the spring of 1960. They became further acquainted at a meeting at the LDS Longfellow Park Chapel in Cambridge, Massachusetts, the next summer. Johnson was a native of Palo Alto and was a student at Stanford University. She had previously studied summers at the University of Vienna and University of Paris and was studying at Harvard University the summer she met Eyring. Wilbur Cox, the LDS Church's district president (to whom Eyring was serving as a counselor), made accommodations to facilitate Eyring's dating Johnson. After an intense courtship that first summer, Eyring and Johnson continued courting with her making multiple cross-country airplane trips until they were engaged early in 1961. They were married in the LDS Church's Logan Temple in July 1962, with the marriage performed by his uncle, Spencer W. Kimball.

They are the parents of six children (four sons and two daughters). Their sons include Henry J. Eyring, president of BYU–Idaho; and Matthew J. Eyring, the Chief Strategy Innovation Officer of Vivint, a home automation company in North America. Eyring is a first cousin once-removed of former Michigan Governor George W. Romney; his paternal grandmother was Romney's aunt.
Romney's son, Mitt, was the 2012 Republican Presidential nominee and a former Massachusetts governor who is currently serving in Congress as the junior senator from Utah.

Honors
Honorary Doctor of Humane Letters, University of Utah (2015)
Honorary Doctor of Humane Letters, Utah Valley University (2017)

Published works

. Database:PsycINFO Electronic, accessed March 12, 2009

Speeches

See also

Council on the Disposition of the Tithes
Glenn L. Pace, counselor with Eyring in the presiding bishopric

Notes

References

"Henry B. Eyring, First Counselor in the Presiding Bishopric", Ensign, May 1985.

External links
 
"General Authorities: President Henry B. Eyring", churchofjesuschrist.org
Grampa Bill's G.A. Pages: Henry B. Eyring
Multimedia

()

1933 births
American general authorities (LDS Church)
Apostles (LDS Church)
Commissioners of Church Education (LDS Church)
Counselors in the First Presidency (LDS Church)
Counselors in the Presiding Bishopric (LDS Church)
Harvard Business School alumni
Living people
Presidents of Brigham Young University–Idaho
Stanford University Graduate School of Business faculty
University of Utah alumni
Sunday School (LDS Church) people
Latter Day Saints from New Jersey
Latter Day Saints from Utah
Latter Day Saints from California
Latter Day Saints from Idaho
Latter Day Saints from Massachusetts
Latter Day Saints from New Mexico